Fabbrica Ligure Automobili Genova, F.L.A.G., FLAG, was an Italian automobile manufacturer founded in 1905 by investors in La Spezia, Liguria, that produced large, prestigious, luxury vehicles. Shortly after founding it transferred to Genoa and then in 1909 it merged with Società Piemontese Automobili (S.P.A.) in Turin.

History
The company was established in 1905 by investors in La Spezia, Liguria, Italy to produce large, prestigious, luxury vehicles, but shortly after founding it transferred to Genoa. The lack of technical skills in the Genoese workforce forced the company to seek business partners, and resulted in both the 1907 closure of the Genoa plant and the 1909 merger with the Turin automobile manufacturer Società Piemontese Automobili (SPA). The new company traded as Società Ligure Piemontese Automobili.

The company was also the Italian agent for Thornycroft vehicles.

Manufacturing
The emphasis on quality meant that steel was imported from Krupp in Germany and vehicle testing was extensive, but lack of technical skills in the workforce resulted in both the 1907 closure of the Genoa plant and the 1909 transfer of manufacturing to the Turin manufacturer Società Piemontese Automobili (SPA).

Vehicles
The initial cars were a 12/16 hp and 16/24 hp, both with four-cylinder engines and shaft drive. Later they added a 40 hp model with chain drive. All engines had the cylinders cast in pairs. The range was expanded with six-cylinder models rated as 40 and 70 hp.

Competition
In 1906 the Marchese Giovanni Battista Raggio  won the Circuito Bresciano with a "FLAG 6S/40".

F.L.A.G. initially entered 3 cars for the 1907 I Kaiser Preis held on 13–14 June in the Taunus mountains, but only Carlo Raggio was named and no vehicles started.

See also

 List of Italian companies

References

Includes translation from German Wikipedia
Enciclopedia dell'Automobile - Volumi singoli  By Script edizioni. F.L.A.G. 1905-1907 article
The Complete Encyclopedia of Motorcars, 1885 to the Present, by G.N. Georgano. Article - F.L.A.G. I (1905-1908)

External links 
 Image of FLAG 6S/40 in AutoEncyclopedia
Società Piemontese Automobili unofficial site 

Defunct motor vehicle manufacturers of Italy
Manufacturing companies based in Genoa
Vehicle manufacturing companies established in 1905
Italian companies established in 1905
Fiat
Ceirano family